Walter Edwards may refer to:

Walter Alison Edwards (1862–1924), president of the California Institute of Technology
Walter Edwards (director) (1870–1920), American film director
Walter Atlee Edwards (1886–1928), United States Navy officer and Medal of Honor recipient
Stoker Edwards (1900–1964), British Member of Parliament
Walter Edwards (footballer) (1924–2018), English footballer 
Wally Edwards (born 1949), Australian cricketer

See also
Wally Edward, Australian footballer